The 2000 Penn Quakers football team represented the University of Pennsylvania in the 2000 NCAA Division I-AA football season.

Schedule

Roster

References

Penn
Penn Quakers football seasons
Ivy League football champion seasons
Penn Quakers football